KDPT-LP (102.9 FM) is a community radio station licensed to Dos Palos, California, United States.

See also
List of community radio stations in the United States

External links
 

DPT
Community radio stations in the United States
DPT-LP